The men's discus throw event at the 1979 Summer Universiade was held at the Estadio Olimpico Universitario in Mexico City on 10 September 1979.

Results

References

Athletics at the 1979 Summer Universiade
1979